Isterico (in English "Hysterical") is the first demo of the Italian punk rock band Punkreas. It was registered as the first record of the band in late 1990.

Track listing
No Cops- 2:29
Isterico- 3:20
Persia - 2:22
Anarchia- 1:26
Antisocialism- 2:37
Funny - 1:26
Fegato Centenario - 2:04
Il vicino - 2:11

Personnel
 Cippa - Vocals
 Noyse - Guitar
 Caludio - Guitar
 Paletta - Bass
 Mastino - Drums

References

1990 albums
Punkreas albums